The Roscoe Wind Farm near Roscoe, Texas is one of the world's largest-capacity wind farms. With 627 wind turbines and a total installed capacity of 781.5 MW, owned and operated by RWE. At the time of its completion in 2009, it was the largest wind farm in the world, surpassing the nearby 735.5-megawatt Horse Hollow Wind Energy Center. In 2012, it was overtaken by California's 1,020-megawatt Alta Wind Energy Center.

Facility details 

Roscoe was constructed in four phases. The first phase, Roscoe, was constructed in 2008 and consists of 209 Mitsubishi 1-megawatt turbines. Phase two is called Champion was also completed in 2008 and includes 55 Siemens 2.3-megawatt machines. The third phase is called Pyron. Its 166 GE 1.5-megawatt turbines were commissioned in mid-2009 shortly before the fourth phase, Inadale, was completed. Inadale adds 197 more Mitsubishi 1-megawatt turbines to the existing project.

The project cost more than $1 billion and provides enough power for more than 250,000 average Texan homes.

Cliff Etheredge, a local cotton farmer, helped to organize the project. In addition to its large size, the farm is also notable for the large number of individual land owners (as many as 400) who share in royalties from the project. Wind farms are helping to revive the local economy in remote areas of West Texas and the Texas Panhandle.

The Roscoe Wind Farm and Cliff Etheredge are featured in the 2010 documentary film, Carbon Nation.

Electricity production

See also 

Wind power in the United States
List of onshore wind farms
Wind power in Texas
List of power stations in Texas

References 

RWE
Energy infrastructure completed in 2008
Energy infrastructure completed in 2009
Wind farms in Texas
Buildings and structures in Nolan County, Texas